Ross Philip Mintzer (born May 26, 1987) is an American musician and performer. He has led the Ross Mintzer Band since its formation in 2012. Mintzer was featured on National Public Radio show From the Top. In 2011, he started a girls' choir in Karachi, Pakistan and has been recognized by the National Association for Music Education.

Early life
Mintzer was born in 1987 in New York City. Mintzer is the son of Richard and Cheryl Mintzer, he has a sister Emmaly. His grandfather Stanley Kushner was an electrical contractor. The paternal side of Mintzer's family is Jewish and immigrated from Kaunus, Lithuania to Westchester County, New York in 1914. He began learning the saxophone at age 8, after being influenced by his uncle, Bob Mintzer, a Grammy Award-winning jazz saxophone player. He also plays tenor saxophone, flute, and guitar, in addition to singing and composing. Mintzer was sexually molested when he was six by a thirteen year old male neighbor.

Mintzer played in the Jazz Band at Mamaroneck High School and in the band Dr. Meeker in New York before formally studying music during high school at the Interlochen Arts Academy in Michigan. Mintzer continued his studies during college at the Manhattan School of Music. In high school, he played tenor sax in jazz combo and jazz band. He has studied privately with New York saxophonist, Marc Mommaas.

In 2005, Mintzer was one of 29 high school students selected for the Gibson/Baldwin Jazz Ensembles for the 47th Annual Grammy Music Awards in Los Angeles. Mintzer performed at the Fonda Theatre in Hollywood with award-winning Jazz saxophonist Benny Golson. That same year, he was a featured performer on the National Public Radio program "From the Top" with bassist Michael Thurber. They performed J.S. Bach's Two-Part Inventions No.1 and No. 2. He was also a co-winner in Downbeat Magazine's 28th Annual Student Awards in the Blues/Pop/Rock Soloist and Jazz Instrumental Soloist categories. Jazziz magazine invited him to perform on its compilation album "Jazziz on Disc," a limited-edition collector's CD issued with the October 2005 edition.

Career

2005–2012: Remington and Music in Pakistan
Mintzer was the guitarist and composer for Remington, a duo with bassist Michael Thurber, which became a trio with the addition of drummer Greg Evans. The Band was named after their mentor David Remington. In 2009, Mintzer traveled to teach music. He began touring around the country with fellow Interlochen alumnus Michael Thurber to hold music clinics for young musicians.

Beginning in February 2011, Mintzer taught in the Performing Arts Department of the American University of Sharjah in the United Arab Emirates. From October 2011 to February 2012, he taught English and music in Karachi, Pakistan to children at The Garage School. He also organized music events for the students and directed a girls' choir. In June 2012, Mintzer rode his bicycle across the United States to honor soldiers who died in Afghanistan and Iraq and to protest US drone strikes in Pakistan.

2012–present: Ross Mintzer
In 2012, he formed The Ross Mintzer Band. According to the band website, they have released two singles and one music video, and have performed in Chicago, St. Louis, Boulder, Madison, Los Angeles, and New York City. In February 2014, Mintzer was interviewed and played his song "Open Happiness" on NHK's program "World Wave Morning." He was conferred an "Honorary Life Membership" to the Tri-M Music Honor Society, a program of the National Association for Music Education, "For inspiring young musicians to achieve and for serving music education." on May 5, 2014. Mintzer states that he uses Facebook to reach fans; his band's Facebook page has over one million followers. On July 7, 2015, Mintzer performed, "The Star-Spangled Banner" in Colorado Springs, CO at Security Service Field before a Sky Sox baseball game.

Mintzer released his song, Refugee, as a single in 2015. On April 7, 2016, Mintzer released Stronger, a song that utilizes multiple synthesizers with various timbres and qualities. Mintzer's songs were streamed over 20 million times in 2016. According to social media analytics site, Twitter Counter, as of January 16, 2017, Mintzer is ranked #1,861 for the number of followers among all Twitter users. In 2016 and 2017, Mintzer served as a part-time instructor for the WeBop program at Jazz at Lincoln Center.

Mintzer released "Destiny" featuring singer Xav A. on January 7, 2018. The video for "Destiny" has over 3 million views on his YouTube Artist Channel and Facebook Page, as of April 27, 2020. On December 12th, 2019 Mintzer became an Amazon Influencer.  On September 20, 2018 Mintzer released his first solo EP, "Imagine". Mintzer released his song "The Owl" on February 13, 2019 and stated "the song is about how we are capable of so much more than we think we are." On May 18, 2019 Mintzer performed a show with guest speaker and Afghan social activist Fereshteh Forough at the Regency in Brooklyn, New York. He performed a show at the Mamaroneck High School in New York on September 20, 2019.

Discography

Songs
 Guayaquil (2005)
 Two Step for a Rainy Day (2005)
 Refugee (2015)
 Stronger (2016)
 Destiny (ft. Xav A.) (2018)
 See You Again (2019)
 Remember (2019)
 Feels The Same (2019)
 Days (2019)
 The Owl (2019)
 Love Me The Way I Am (2020)

EPs with Remington
 Songs For Our Friends (2007)
 Thank You Mr. Remington (2008)
 Warm Winter (2008)
 Human Music" (2009)

Songs with Ross Mintzer Band
 Victory (2013)
 World Goes Round (2013)
 Lost in America (2013)
 Freedom (2013)
 Open Happiness(Ft. Milton Vann)'' (2013)

References

External links

 
 

1987 births
American jazz tenor saxophonists
American male saxophonists
Living people
21st-century American singers
Songwriters from New York (state)
Interlochen Center for the Arts alumni
Manhattan School of Music alumni
Singers from New York City
American rock guitarists
American male guitarists
American people of Lithuanian-Jewish descent
American people of Polish descent
American people of Russian descent
American electronic musicians
American indie pop musicians
American indie rock musicians
21st-century American guitarists
21st-century American saxophonists
Guitarists from New York City
Jazz musicians from New York (state)
21st-century American male singers
American male jazz musicians
American male songwriters